The Sogozha is a river in Vologda and Yaroslavl Oblasts in Russia.

The river terminates in the Rybinsk Reservoir of the Volga. Before the construction of the Rybinsk Reservoir the Sogozha was a tributary of the Sheksna.

The town of Poshekhonye is situated on the left (southern) bank of the  Sogozha. Historically, the river received two left tributaries, the Soga (from the east) and the Pertomka (from the south) within the city limits. Due to the water level rise caused by the Rybinsk Reservoir, the Sogozha and the Soga now form a wide bay at their joint entering of the reservoir.

References 

Rivers of Vologda Oblast
Rivers of Yaroslavl Oblast